McQuinn is a surname. Notable people with the surname include:

Delores McQuinn (born 1954), American politician
Donald E. McQuinn (born 1930), American writer
George McQuinn (1910–1978), American baseball player
Harry McQuinn (1906–1986), American racecar driver
Jason McQuinn, American anarchist

See also
Quinn (disambiguation)